Mycolicibacter arupensis (formerly Mycobacterium arupense) is a slowly growing mycobacterium first isolated from soil and human sputum samples in Spain. Etymology: arupense, pertaining to the ARUP Institute for Clinical and Experimental Pathology, where the type strain was characterized.

Description
Microscopy
Gram-positive, nonmotile and acid-fast rods (1–3 µm × 0.5–0.7 µm), mostly strong acid-fast.

Colony characteristics
 Colonies are eugonic, rough and nonpigmented.

Physiology
Colonies occur within 5 days at 30 °C (optimum temperature, no growth at 45 °C) on Löwenstein-Jensen medium and on Middlebrook 7H10 agar and slowly (10–12 days) at 37 °C; no growth occurs at 42 °C.
No growth on MacConkey agar without crystal violet.
The type strain is resistant to D-cycloserine, streptomycin, isoniazid (0.1 and 1 mg/L), rifampin, and thiacetazone and is susceptible to isoniazid (10 mg/L), kanamycin, and capreomycin.

Pathogenesis
There are emerging reports of human pathogenesis caused by M. arupensis. Pulmonary infection and tenosynovitis have been documented. A recent case of recurrent soft tissue abscess caused by M. arupensis has been identified.

References

External links
Type strain of Mycolicibacter arupensis at BacDive -  the Bacterial Diversity Metadatabase

Acid-fast bacilli
arupense
Bacteria described in 2006